Ken or Kenneth Wallace may refer to:
 Ken Wallace (canoeist) (born 1983), Australian sprint canoeist
 Ken Wallace (cricketer) (born 1936), English cricketer
 Ken Wallace (footballer) (born 1952), English footballer
 Ken M. Wallace (1944–2018), British mechanical engineer
 Kenny Wallace (born 1963), American stock car racing driver